Robert Guthrie (1916–1995) was an American microbiologist.

Robert Guthrie may also refer to:

Robert Guthrie (politician) (1857–1921), member of the Australian Senate 
Robert V. Guthrie (1930–2005), American psychologist and educator

See also
 Guthrie (surname)
 Guthrie (disambiguation)